Edward Townson Churton (1841–1 May 1912) was an Anglican colonial bishop in the late 19th and early 20th centuries.

Born into an ecclesiastical family  in 1841 and educated at Eton and Oriel College, Oxford he was ordained in 1866. He held incumbencies at St Nicholas, Ganton and  St Bartholomew, Charlton next Dover before being ordained to the episcopate as Bishop of Nassau. Upon his resignation, he was succeeded by his younger brother Henry. He died on 1 May 1912.

Notes

1841 births
People educated at Eton College
Alumni of Oriel College, Oxford
19th-century Anglican bishops in the Caribbean
20th-century Anglican bishops in the Caribbean
Anglican bishops of Nassau
1912 deaths
Anglo-Catholic bishops